Marjorie Judith Vincent is an American journalist and former beauty contestant who was crowned Miss America 1991.

Early life and education
Vincent's parents, Lucien and Florence Vincent of Cap-Haïtien, Haiti migrated to the United States in the early 1960s; Marjorie was the first of their children to be born in the United States.  She grew up in Oak Park, Illinois, attending Catholic school and taking ballet and piano lessons. Vincent entered DePaul University as a music major, switching to business in junior year and graduating in 1988. Winnings from beauty pageants helped to pay her schooling.

Pageantry
After two unsuccessful pageant tries, at Miss North Carolina and Miss Illinois, she won Miss Illinois, allowing her to advance to Miss America. At the Miss America pageant, she performed the Fantaisie-Impromptu (Op. posth. 66) by Chopin, won the crown, and became Miss America 1991 on 7 September 1990, succeeding Debbye Turner. Her win marked the first occasion in which there were back-to-back African American Miss America winners. Vincent was the last Miss America to be serenaded by Bert Parks.

Career
Vincent, who already had two years in law school at Duke University before becoming Miss America, changed her goal from international law to television journalism, becoming a news anchor at WGBC in Meridian, Mississippi in October 1993. She later worked at WHOI in Peoria, Illinois and the Ohio News Network in Columbus, Ohio.

Vincent completed her J.D. degree at Florida Coastal School of Law in Jacksonville, Florida. She's been admitted to the Florida Bar since 2011 and previously worked for the Office of the Attorney General in Daytona Beach, Florida. She currently works as an ADA in Alabama

Personal life
Vincent has a son, Cameron, who was born in 1994. She married Wesley Tripp in November 2006.

References

External links
Bio at MissAmerica.org
Video of her talent performance
Video of her crowning as Miss America

1964 births
Living people

American television news anchors 
DePaul University alumni
Duke University alumni
Florida Coastal School of Law alumni
Miss America 1991 delegates
Miss America Preliminary Talent winners
Miss America winners
People from Oak Park, Illinois
Journalists from Illinois
American women television journalists
21st-century American women